Oscarsborg Fortress is a coastal fortress in the Oslofjord, close to the small town of Drøbak in Viken county, Norway. The best known part is situated on two small islets. The main artillery batteries are on the island Håøya and smaller batteries on the mainland to the west and east in the fjord and was military territory until 2003 when it was made a publicly available resort island. The fortress is best known for sinking  the German heavy cruiser Blücher on 9 April 1940. In 2014, Oscarsborg Fortress was given protected status.

Early history

The narrows at Drøbak, called Drøbaksundet, is a natural point for the naval defence of Oslo, the capital of Norway. The first defences were constructed during the reign of Christian IV of Denmark and Norway and were ready in 1644. The fortifications were however not involved in battle during the Hannibal War.

After the war the fortifications were dismantled, and only resurrected for a short period during the 1814 war with Sweden.

Around 1830 the discussion started for a renewed fortification of the Drøbak Narrows and the first stage was ready in 1848, the next in 1853. The name of the fortress was given by royal resolution on 23 August 1855 after a visit by the Swedish-Norwegian King Oscar I.

By the end of the 19th century the art of war developed rapidly and the new fortress was soon obsolete. The tension was also growing between the two countries in the union and so the Norwegians decided to upgrade the fortress. From 1890 new improved German guns were installed, an underwater barrier was built in 1874–79, and an underwater torpedo battery was constructed. The main armament was three 28 cm calibre guns (11 inch) manufactured by Krupp. There were also a number of guns with smaller calibres (15 cm and 57 mm) on the mainland. An underwater barrier went from the main islet of Kaholmen and south-west to Hurum on the western side of the fjord, thus making it impossible for large vessels to sail west of the fortress.

20th century

Torpedo battery
Having been constructed in 1898–1901, and put into service on 15 July 1901, the underground torpedo facility remained one of the few Norwegian defence installations unknown to German military intelligence at the point of the 9 April 1940 invasion. The battery was one of two in Norway and differed from the other torpedo battery, at Kvarven Fort, in that it was designed to launch its torpedoes from under the water level, instead of by torpedo tube from above ground as was the case with the battery at Kvarven outside Bergen.

At Oscarsborg the torpedo battery is a concrete construction inside a cave mined into the rock of the North Kaholmen island. Two torpedoes are loaded side by side, in two open steel frames. Then one of the two frames is lowered like an elevator down into the water to the tunnels below. After one shot, it took some time to swap frames and be ready for the next. When fired, the torpedo's own compressed air engine was started and it propelled itself. The battery has three torpedo tunnels which could fire six torpedoes without reloading and a total of nine torpedoes was stored and ready for use. Each weapon carried a 100 kg TNT warhead and targets were spotted from three observation bunkers just above the battery.

The torpedoes were delivered in 1900 from the Whitehead torpedo factory in Fiume, then part of Austria-Hungary. A back-up observation bunker is situated just outside the entrance to the battery.

Second World War

When Norway was invaded on 9 April 1940, all of the fortress' armament was over 40 years old, and of German origin. Both the guns and the torpedo battery worked flawlessly when Oscarsborg encountered one of the German invasion flotillas; they sank the heavy cruiser Blücher, and threw back the German naval force heading for Oslo, thus managing to save the Norwegian King and government from being taken prisoner.

During the occupation of Norway, German forces were stationed at Oscarsborg.

The fortress was returned to Norwegian control on 12 May 1945 when Captain Thorleif Unneberg took command of the fortifications and raised the Norwegian flag following the capitulation of all German forces in Norway four days earlier. The flag in question was the same that had flown over the fortress until it was captured by the Germans in April 1940. Colonel Birger Eriksen was present on the occasion and made a speech.

After the Second World War

During the Cold War Oscarsborg formed a last line of defence for Oslo, with the underground torpedo battery remaining secretly active up until 1 January 1993, having been modernized in the 1980s.

After the deactivation of the last weapons systems, the remaining military activity on Oscarsborg consisted of the Coastal Artillery officer training programme. The officer school was officially shut down on 28 June 2002.

The fortress is now largely a civilian resort and attraction, open for visitors. Parts of the former fortress are used as a hotel resort. The scenic surroundings is much used for conferences and excursions. Visitors take a short motor launch trip from Drøbak.

On 8 April 2014 the 28 cm guns of the main battery were fired with blank rounds when the fortress was used as a location of a scene for the production of the 2016 film The King's Choice, directed by Erik Poppe. In their coverage of the filming the newspaper Aftenposten claimed that the filming occasion was the first time the guns had been fired since 9 April 1940. The claim by Aftenposten is however contradicted by the fact that the guns were actually last fired during testing in 1952.

After a prolonged process, Oscarsborg Fortress was listed as a protected site in 2014, effective from 9 April 2014.

Footnotes

Literature

External links 

Oscarsborg Fortress (Visit Follo) 
Oscarsborg Hotel & SPA 
The official website for the fortress today 
Oscarsborg Museum website 

Forts in Norway
Military and war museums in Norway
Military history of Norway during World War II
World War II sites in Norway
Frogn
Museums in Viken
Protected areas of Norway
Military installations in Viken
Military installations established in 1848
1848 establishments in Norway
Military installations closed in 2002
2002 disestablishments in Norway